João Carlos Cardoso Santo (born 1 March 1995), or simply João Carlos, is a Brazilian professional footballer who plays as a forward for Portuguese club Estoril.

Club career
On 31 August 2018, he joined Portimonense S.C. on loan for the 2018–19 season.

On 3 August 2021, he was loaned to Académica de Coimbra in Liga Portugal 2.

References

External links
Portimonense profile 

1995 births
Sportspeople from Bahia
Living people
Brazilian footballers
Association football forwards
Galícia Esporte Clube players
Bonsucesso Futebol Clube players
Boa Esporte Clube players
Macaé Esporte Futebol Clube players
Associação Desportiva Cabofriense players
Fluminense FC players
Portimonense S.C. players
Associação Atlética Ponte Preta players
Clube de Regatas Brasil players
G.D. Estoril Praia players
Associação Académica de Coimbra – O.A.F. players
Campeonato Brasileiro Série D players
Campeonato Brasileiro Série C players
Campeonato Brasileiro Série A players
Primeira Liga players
Campeonato Brasileiro Série B players
Liga Portugal 2 players
Brazilian expatriate footballers
Expatriate footballers in Portugal
Brazilian expatriate sportspeople in Portugal